Akhalik (Ahalig) is a rural locality (a selo) in Tunkinsky District, Republic of Buryatia, Russia. The population was 305 as of 2010. There are 2 streets.

Geography 
Akhalik is located 49 km northeast of Kyren (the district's administrative centre) by road. Yelovka is the nearest rural locality.

References 

Rural localities in Tunkinsky District